Brittnau-Wikon railway station is a railway station in the municipality of Wikon, in the Swiss canton of Lucerne. It is an intermediate stop on the standard gauge Olten–Lucerne line of Swiss Federal Railways.

Services
The following services stop at Brittnau-Wikon:

References

External links 
 
 

Railway stations in the canton of Lucerne
Swiss Federal Railways stations